Robert Michael Leslie-Carter MICE, MAIPM (born 24 October 1970) is a British engineer and project manager with consulting firm Arup, based in London.  He was named 'Project Manager of the Year' at the 2003 UK Association for Project Management awards for his role leading the new Laban Dance School in Deptford, London . In 2008 he collected the 'International Project of the Year' awards from both the Australian Institute of Project Management and the UK Association for Project Management for managing Arup's design team on the Water Cube in Beijing.

In 2009 the Association for Project Management named him one of the top 10 project influencers in the world. The 'impact list' highlights individuals who have had the biggest influence on the project management profession – recognised for shaping major programs and projects and also for inspiring and motivating others in their profession.

In 2015 he was awarded the UK Building International Project of the Year award for the New Acton Nishi development in Canberra, and the MCA Innovation Project of the Year award for his work on the Croydon Integrated Five Year delivery Plan with Croydon Council.

Early and persona life 

Leslie-Carter was born in Oxford, England on 24 October 1970.  After periods living in Doha, Qatar (1972–76) and Chester (1976–82) his family returned to Oxford in 1982.

From Magdalen College School in Oxford, he went on to study Civil Engineering at the University of Bristol, graduating in 1992.

Leslie-Carter married Claire Saxby in 2000. They have four children – two daughters (Isabel and Eve) born at home in East London, and two sons (Lawrence and Arthur) born at home in Sydney.

Arup career 

Leslie-Carter has worked with Arup since graduating from Bristol University in 1992.  He began his career in Arup's Newcastle office, and spent periods in Arup's Middlesbrough and Manchester offices before moving to Arup Project Management in London in 1996. With Arup Project Management, his first major Client role was managing the start up and technical multiplex construction for the start up of OnDigital, a direct competitor to Sky at the launch of Digital terrestrial television in 1998.

From 1998 to 2002, Leslie-Carter was Client Project Manager for the Laban Dance School in Deptford, south-east London.  He was named 'Project Manager of the Year' at the 2003 UK Association for Project Management Awards, for his leadership of the project. Designed by Swiss architects Jacques Herzog and Pierre de Meuron, Laban also won the Stirling Prize for Architecture in 2003, the UK Royal Fine Arts Commission Trust Award, and a High Commendation at the British Construction Industry Awards. In 2008, five years after it opened, Laban was named Britain's most inspiring building by the Daily Telegraph. During his 4½ years working on the Laban project, he completed an MBA at Imperial College Business School, met and married his wife Claire Saxby, and had the first two of their four children. The week after Laban's opening ceremony, Leslie-Carter and his family moved with Arup to Sydney, Australia.

Between 2003 and 2008, Leslie-Carter managed Arup's multi-disciplinary design team for the Beijing National Aquatics Centre (the Water Cube), for the 2008 Summer Olympics. The Water Cube hosted the swimming and diving and events at the 2008 Olympic Games. 25 world records were broken in what is now the fastest pool in world, and Michael Phelps set a new Olympic landmark with eight gold medals. In 2008 Leslie-Carter collected the 'International Project of the Year' awards from both the Australian Institute of Project Management and the UK Association for Project Management for his role on the Water Cube.  Working with PTW Architects, and CSCEC International Design, the Water Cube has also won the 2004 Venice Biennale Architecture Awards, the Sir William Hudson Award at the Australian Engineering Excellence Awards, and the MacRobert Award – the UK's biggest prize for engineering innovation.

From 2005 onwards, he was involved in major Australian infrastructure projects, including the redevelopment of Sydney's Town Hall Rail station, advising the Australian Department of Defence on Public Private Partnership project transactions, and the Domestic Terminal Expansion at Brisbane Airport. Between 2009 and 2012 he led Arup's Project Management team on NewActon Nishi - ‘Australia’s most sustainable building’ and the centrepiece of Canberra’s award-winning NewActon precinct.  Nishi was named International Project of the year at the 2015 UK Building Awards.  During his stay in Australia he was a guest lecturer at the University of New South Wales, part of their Masters of Project Management course.

Leslie-Carter moved back to England with his family in November 2013, and is a Director in Arup's London office.  In April 2017 he created and was lead author for 'Future of Project Management', a collaboration between Arup, The Bartlett School of Construction and Project Management at UCL, and the Association for Project Management, with crowdsourced inputs from the global project management community.  He is currently helping to lead Arup's team on Europe's biggest project High Speed 2.

Sporting career

Hockey career

Leslie-Carter played 1st Grade club hockey from 1989 to 2000. Having represented Oxfordshire County at schoolboy level, his hockey career developed at Bristol University, where he played in the University 1st XI side that won the National University (UAU) Championships in 1991.

From 1992 to 1996, Leslie-Carter played in Newcastle for Gateshead Hockey Club (formerly Swalwell Hockey Club). He was top scorer for the club in the 94/95 (19 goals) and 95/96 (24 goals) seasons. His goals, mainly from short corner strikes, helped Swalwell to promotion to the Northern Premier League in 1996, and back-to-back Northumberland Cup wins. Leslie-Carter played in many UK hockey tournaments with North East touring side 'The Pallatics', winning three tournament titles at the Glaxo Hockey Festival in 1997, 1998 and 2000. In his final appearance for 'The Pallatics', he scored 11 goals in a match at the Portsmouth Islanders Tournament in 2000. He also played full county level for Northumberland in the 1994 and 1995 National County Championships.

From 1996 he played three seasons in the 1st XI for Hampstead and Westminster Hockey Club. Throughout his time at H&W, he played in a central sweeper role. In his first 1996/97 season, under player coach and Great Britain international Rob Thompson, H&W won the Southern Premier League undefeated, and were promoted to the English National League after winning the playoff tournament at the National Hockey Stadium in Milton Keynes. In the 1997/98 season, H&W finished fifth in National League Division 1 – its best place to date – with Leslie-Carter at the centre of a defence with the best record in the league. During his time with Hampstead and Westminster, Leslie-Carter played in international hockey tournaments in the Netherlands, Germany and around the UK.

Other Sports

Leslie-Carter ran the Great North Run in 1994 and 1995, the London Marathon in 1996, the Sydney Half Marathon in 2006 and 2009, and has run Sydney's City to Surf run every year since 2003.

In 2005 he gained his Bronze Medallion to become a qualified Surf Lifesaver at Bronte Beach Surf Club in Sydney.

Selected Projects

Rob Leslie-Carter's major projects include:

Completed

 Laban School of Dance & Visual Arts, London
 Beijing National Aquatics Centre (The Water Cube)
 New Acton Nishi Development
 Croydon Five Year Integrated Delivery Plan
 OnDigital Start Up, London
 Deutsche Bank Global Program including Deutsche Bank Place, Sydney and One Raffles Quay, Singapore
 Randwick Racecourse Redevelopment, NSW
 Greenhouse by Joost, Sydney
 National Portrait Gallery Australia, Canberra
 Middlehaven Redevelopment including the new Riverside Stadium for Middlesbrough F.C.
 Newcastle Quayside Redevelopment
 Manchester Airport Terminal 3
 Headquarters Joint Operations Command Project, Canberra
 Western Front Interpretive Centre, Northern France
 Nation Building Economic Stimulus Program, NSW
 Brisbane Airport Domestic Terminal Expansion, QLD

Proposed or under construction

 High Speed 2
 Springfield University Hospital Estates Modernisation Programme, London
 Barangaroo Urban Precinct, Sydney NSW
 Town Hall railway station Redevelopment, Sydney NSW

References

External links 

Living people
1970 births
People educated at Magdalen College School, Oxford
Alumni of the University of Bristol
British expatriates in Australia
English civil engineers
Sportspeople from Oxford
English male field hockey players